Francis William Davenport  (9 April 1847, Wilderslowe, near Derby - 1 April, 1925, Scarborough) was an English musician and composer. In 1879  was appointed professor, at the Royal Academy of Music. Then in 1882 he became a professor at the Guildhall School of Music.

Davenport read law at University College, Oxford. However, he decided to have a career in music, studying under George Alexander Macfarren. In 1873 he married Macfarren's daughter Clarina Thalia Macfarren (23 Mar 1848-10 Jul 1934). They had several children; son Robert, a writer and illustrator of children's stories and popular song lyricist, was father of the critic John Davenport

Whilst teaching at the Royal Academy of Music, he taught harmony and counterpoint to Alicia Adélaide Needham, the mother of Joseph Needham.

His daughter, originally Gertrude Mary Davenport married Eden Paul, with whom she published many works under the name Cedar Paul. His nephew, Christopher Wilson, was a composer, conductor and music director for the theatre.

Works
 Symphony in D minor: this won the Crystal Palace Symphony Competition in 1876.
 Symphony No 2 in C major.
 Twelfth Night, overture for orchestra
 Prelude and Fugue for orchestra
 Piano Trio
 Six Pieces for piano and cello
 Pictures on a Journey, suite for piano
 Many partsongs and songs

Publications
 Elements of Music (1884)
 Elements of Harmony and Counterpoint (1886)
 Guide for Pianoforte Students (with Percy Baker) (1891)

References

English male musicians
English composers
1847 births
1925 deaths